Prostanthera wilkieana is a species of flowering plant that is endemic to the more arid areas of Australia. It is an erect, densely-branched shrub with elliptic to narrow egg-shaped leaves with the narrower end towards the base and mauve to pale violet or white flowers with deep purple streaks and yellowish brown dots inside the petal tube.

Description
Flowering occurs from July to November.

Taxonomy and naming
Prostanthera wilkieana was first formally described in 1874 by Ferdinand von Mueller in Fragmenta Phytographiae Australiae from specimens collected by Ernest Giles. The specific epithet (wilkieana) honour's von Mueller's friend David Elliot Wilkie, a senator in the government of the Colony of Victoria.

Distribution and habitat
This mint-bush occurs in arid areas of central Western Australia, the far south-west of the Northern Territory and the north-west of South Australia where it grows in spinifex sandplain communities.

Conservation status
Prostanthera wilkieana is listed as "near threatened" by the Northern Territory Government Parks and Wildlife Commission Act but as "not threatened" in Western Australia by the Western Australian Government Department of Parks and Wildlife.

References

wilkieana
Flora of South Australia
Flora of Western Australia
Flora of the Northern Territory
Lamiales of Australia
Plants described in 1874
Taxa named by Ferdinand von Mueller